Dragan Perišić (born 27 October 1979) is a Serbian football manager and former player. He is currently the manager of Napredak Kruševac.

Playing career
Born in Belgrade, Perišić was a member of Železnik for several years, but never managed to establish himself as a first-team regular. He instead went out on loan to several domestic clubs, before moving abroad in 2004. Over the next eight years, Perišić played in the Czech Republic (Jablonec), Romania (Pandurii Târgu Jiu), Ukraine (Metalurh Zaporizhzhia), Azerbaijan (Simurq), Bangladesh (Sheikh Jamal), and Malta (Birkirkara). He returned to his homeland and joined Zemun in the 2012 winter transfer window.

Managerial career
After hanging up his boots, Perišić served as manager of Brodarac 1947, Jedinstvo Stara Pazova, Sinđelić Beograd (September 2020–April 2021), Radnički Pirot, and Radnički Sremska Mitrovica.

References

External links
 
 

1979 births
Living people
Footballers from Belgrade
Serbia and Montenegro footballers
Serbian footballers
Association football defenders
FK Železnik players
FK Balkan Mirijevo players
FK Dorćol players
FK Rudar Pljevlja players
FK Jablonec players
CS Pandurii Târgu Jiu players
FC Metalurh Zaporizhzhia players
Simurq PIK players
Sheikh Jamal Dhanmondi Club players
Birkirkara F.C. players
FK Zemun players
First League of Serbia and Montenegro players
Second League of Serbia and Montenegro players
Czech First League players
Liga I players
Ukrainian Premier League players
Azerbaijan Premier League players
Maltese Premier League players
Serbia and Montenegro expatriate footballers
Serbian expatriate footballers
Expatriate footballers in the Czech Republic
Expatriate footballers in Romania
Expatriate footballers in Ukraine
Expatriate footballers in Azerbaijan
Expatriate footballers in Bangladesh
Expatriate footballers in Malta
Serbia and Montenegro expatriate sportspeople in the Czech Republic
Serbia and Montenegro expatriate sportspeople in Romania
Serbian expatriate sportspeople in Ukraine
Serbian expatriate sportspeople in Azerbaijan
Serbian expatriate sportspeople in Bangladesh
Serbian expatriate sportspeople in Malta
Serbian football managers
FK Radnički Pirot managers
FK Napredak Kruševac managers